Sarah Bell is an English silver-medallist World Champion bridge player. She came second in the Women's Pair event in Wroclaw in 2022.

Sarah is a graduate of Cambridge University. She teaches Chemistry at a school in London.

Bridge accomplishments

Wins
 North American Bridge Championships (1)
 Chicago Mixed Board-a-Match (1) 2017

Runners-up
 World Bridge Series Women Pairs (1) 2022

Personal life
Sarah is married to Mike Bell, a professional Bridge player.

References

External links
 
 

English contract bridge players
Living people
Year of birth missing (living people)
Place of birth missing (living people)